Ommatidiotus is a genus of true bugs belonging to the family Caliscelidae.

The species of this genus are found in Europe.

Species:
 Ommatidiotus acutus Horváth, 1905 
 Ommatidiotus alternans Horváth, 1916

References

Caliscelidae